CPR (EP) is the name of Dolour's EP, released September 2003 on B-Side Records. It was written, arranged and produced by Shane Tutmarc.  It debuted "You Can't Make New Old Friends" and "CPR" later released (with a different mix and master) on New Old Friends (2004).

Track listing
 "CPR"
 "You Can't Make New Old Friends"
 "(Why Don't You) Come Around"

References

2003 EPs
Dolour albums